Hull is an unincorporated community and census-designated place (CDP) in Liberty County, Texas, United States. It was named after W. F. Hull, a railroad official. The population was 669 at the 2010 census.

Geography

Education
Hull is zoned to schools in the Hull-Daisetta Independent School District.

Residents of Hull-Daisetta ISD are zoned to Lee College.

References

External links

Unincorporated communities in Liberty County, Texas
Unincorporated communities in Texas
Census-designated places in Liberty County, Texas